The Opitutaceae are a Gram-negative and chemoheterotrophic order of the domain Bacteria. Opitutaceae bacteria were isolated from soil and coastal marine springs.

Phylogeny
The currently accepted taxonomy is based on the List of Prokaryotic names with Standing in Nomenclature (LPSN) and National Center for Biotechnology Information (NCBI)

See also
 List of bacterial orders
 List of bacteria genera

References

Verrucomicrobiota
Bacteria families